The 1971 World Table Tennis Championships (31st) were held in Nagoya from March 28 to April 7, 1971.

The Chinese players returned following a lengthy absence.

The nations represented were Austria, Czechoslovakia, the People's Republic of China, England, West Germany Hungary, India, Japan, North Korea and South Korea, Romania, the Soviet Union, and Yugoslavia.

Medalists

Team

Individual

See also
Ping-pong diplomacy

References

External links
ITTF Museum

 
World Table Tennis Championships
World Table Tennis Championships
World Table Tennis Championships
Table tennis competitions in Japan
Politics and sports
Table
Sports competitions in Nagoya